Events from the year 1525 in Sweden

Incumbents
 Monarch – Gustav I

Events

 - The marriage of the reformer Olaus Petri: on this occasion the mass is celebrated on the Swedish language for the likely first time. 
 - Bishop Hans Brask publicly condemns the teachings of Luther in Linköping, which spreads the ideas of the reformation.  
 - The King confiscate and dissolves the convent in Mariefred. 
 - The first of the Dalecarlian Rebellions.

Births

Deaths

 

 Date unknown - Anna Eriksdotter (Bielke), war heroine (born 1490)

References

External links

 
Years of the 16th century in Sweden
Sweden